Caledoniscincus constellatus is a critically endangered species of lizard in the taxomic family Scincidae. C. constellatus is endemic to the northwest region of New Caledonia and central region of New Caledonia. Adult males of the species are 46 to 57 millimeters in length while adult females of the species are 57 millimeters in length. Caledoniscincus constellatus has a broad pale midlateral stripe on its body that distinguishes it from other Caledoniscincus species with both adult sexes having a bright yellow ventral color.

Caledoniscincus constellatus prefers acacia tree shrubland on costal hills and in dense open maquis of the province Nord, New Caledonia usually of a elevation of 0 to 400 meters. The loss of the acacia tree shrublands and the open maquis is resulting in the extinction of the species Caledoniscincus constellatus which puts. The introduction of animals such as deer and domestic pigs along with increased wildfires and nickel mining also helped in the extinction of the species putting C. constellatus in critical endangerment on the IUCN red list. The population is severely fragmented with the species estimated to occupy 8 kilometer of space and is decreasing but the rate of decreasing is unknown due to the fact that the population number is unknown. Caledoniscincus constellatus was discovered in the year 2012 by Sadlier, WHitaker, Wood and Bauer. The holotype of Caledoniscincus constellatus is MNHN 2011.0228.

References

External links 
 https://www.iucnredlist.org/species/122893519/123469174

constellatus
Skinks of New Caledonia
Endemic fauna of New Caledonia
Reptiles described in 2012
Taxa named by Ross Allen Sadlier
Taxa named by Anthony Whitaker
Taxa named by Perry L. Wood
Taxa named by Aaron M. Bauer